Steamboat Lake State Park is a Colorado state park located in Routt County  north of Steamboat Springs, Colorado, and near the community of Hahns Peak Village. The  park, established west of Hahns Peak in 1967, includes a  reservoir. Plant communities include sagebrush shrubland, quaking aspen and lodgepole pine forests, willow carr and marsh. Commonly seen mammalian wildlife species include mule deer and red fox. The reservoir attracts many species of shorebirds and waterfowl, including sandhill cranes that nest in the wetland areas.

References

State parks of Colorado
Protected areas of Routt County, Colorado
Protected areas established in 1967